Euclea divinorum, called diamond leaf, diamond-leaved euclea, magic guarri, and toothbrush tree, is a species of flowering plant in the genus Euclea, native to eastern and southern Africa. A shrub or small tree, it has many uses in Africa, including as a source for dye for wool, for tanning leather, and an ink, and as a preservative for milk (allowing it to keep for up to a year), and, by chewing on a twig, as a toothbrush.

References

divinorum
Plant dyes
Plants described in 1873